The Institute of Musical Research is a research institution associated with the University of London. Formerly a member of the School of Advanced Study, it is since 2015 affiliated to Royal Holloway, University of London. Its focus is the facilitation of research in music of all traditions and eras, and to support freelance and affiliated scholars alike.

Located at Senate House in Bloomsbury, the Institute of Musical Research was established in 2005 and began operation in 2006.

Notable people

 2006 to 2009: Katharine Ellis; first director
 2009 to 2011: John Irving
 Current director: Stephen Downes

External links
Homepage

Royal Holloway, University of London
University of London
2005 establishments in England